This is a list of stock market crashes and bear markets. The difference between the two relies on speed (how fast declines occur) and length (how long they last). Stock market crashes are quick and brief, while bear markets are slow and prolonged. Those two don't always happen within the same decline.

Table

See also 
 List of recessions in the United States
 List of economic crises
 List of recessions in the United Kingdom
 Economic bubble
 List of banking crises
 List of largest daily changes in the Dow Jones Industrial Average

Notes

References 
 

Stock market crashes
Stock market crashes